The voiced uvular implosive is an extremely rare type of consonantal sound.

Features

Also

Occurrence

See also
 List of phonetics topics
 Voiceless uvular implosive

Notes

References

Uvular consonants
Implosives
Central consonants
Voiced oral consonants